Dominique Fidanza, is a Belgian-Italian singer (born 7 August 1979 in Brussels).

Biography 
Fidanza won the Italian version of the reality television singing competition Popstars and was a member of Italian band Lollipop. In 2006, she moved to France to participate at the French reality television show Star Academy France and she arrived at the end of the show but she lost against Cyril Cinélu. The music video La Place du passager was directed by Jérémie Carboni.

Discography

Singles
"La Place du passager" (2010)

References

External links
Official website
Blog dedicated at Dominique Fidanza

1982 births
Living people
Italian pop singers
Fidanza, Dominique
21st-century Italian women  singers
21st-century Belgian women singers
21st-century Belgian singers